DKC may refer to:

Donkey Kong Country
 Donkey Kong Country, a video game
 Donkey Kong Country (series), a video game series 
 Donkey Kong Country (TV series), a television series

A Person
 DKC, retired orthopaedic surgeon of Nepal often fights for students rights and education system of Nepal.

Other uses
 Dyskeratosis congenita, a genetic disease
 Dyskerin, a gene
 DKC (company), a public relations company